Albrizio is a surname. Notable people with the surname include:

Conrad Albrizio (1894–1973), American muralist
Eileen Albrizio (born 1963), American writer, proofreader, editor, and broadcast journalist

See also
 Abrizio